Myxochlamys is a genus of flowering plants belonging to the family Zingiberaceae.

Its native range is Borneo.

Species:

Myxochlamys amphiloxa 
Myxochlamys mullerensis

References

Zingiberaceae
Zingiberaceae genera